Sunil Gupta may refer to:

 Sunil Kumar Gupta (1914–2009), Jatiya Party (Ershad) politician
 Sunil Gupta (photographer) (born 1953), Indian-born Canadian photographer
 Sunil Das Gupta (died 2004), Indian cricketer